Gábor Faldum (born 24 June 1988) is a Hungarian triathlete. He competed in the men's event at the 2016 Summer Olympics. In 2016 he joined ECS Triathlon, an elite club based in Sartrouville, France.

References

External links
 

1988 births
Living people
Hungarian male triathletes
Olympic triathletes of Hungary
Triathletes at the 2016 Summer Olympics
Place of birth missing (living people)
European Games competitors for Hungary
Triathletes at the 2015 European Games
People from Baja, Hungary
Sportspeople from Bács-Kiskun County
21st-century Hungarian people